Fatih Birol is a Turkish economist and energy expert, who has served as the executive director of the International Energy Agency (IEA) since 1 September 2015. During his time in charge of the IEA, he has taken a series of steps to modernise the Paris-based international organisation, including strengthening ties with emerging economies like India and China and stepping up work on the clean energy transition and international efforts to reach net zero emissions.

Birol was on the Time 100 list of the world's most influential people in 2021, has been named by Forbes magazine among the most influential people on the world's energy scene and recognised by the Financial Times in 2017 as Energy Personality of the Year. Birol is the chairman of the World Economic Forum (Davos) Energy Advisory Board. He is a frequent contributor to print and electronic media and delivers numerous speeches each year at major international summits and conferences.

Early career
Prior to joining the IEA as a junior analyst in 1995,  Birol worked at the Organization of the Petroleum Exporting Countries (OPEC) in Vienna. Over the years at the IEA, Birol worked his way up to the job of Chief Economist, a role in which he was in charge of the IEA's closely watched World Energy Outlook report, before he became executive director in 2015.

A Turkish citizen, Birol was born in Ankara in 1958. He earned a BSc degree in power engineering from the Istanbul Technical University. He received his MSc and PhD in energy economics from the Technical University of Vienna. In 2013, Birol was awarded a Doctorate of Science honoris causa by Imperial College London. He was made an honorary life member of the football club Galatasaray S.K. in 2013.

Other activities
 Africa Europe Foundation (AEF), member of the High-Level Group of Personalities on Africa-Europe Relations (since 2020)

Honours and medals

References

External links

 Fatih Birol's biography
 International Energy Agency
 World Energy Outlook

1958 births
Chevaliers of the Ordre des Palmes Académiques
Energy economists
Officers Crosses of the Order of Merit of the Federal Republic of Germany
International Energy Agency officials
Istanbul Technical University alumni
Knights First Class of the Order of the Polar Star
Living people
Officers of the Order of Merit of the Italian Republic
People from Ankara
Recipients of the Decoration of Honour for Services to the Republic of Austria
Grand Cordons of the Order of the Rising Sun
Turkish economists
TU Wien alumni